Meilly-sur-Rouvres (literally Meilly on Rouvres) is a commune in the Côte-d'Or department in eastern France. The triple divide between the Loire, Rhône, and Seine basins lies within the commune.

Population

See also
Communes of the Côte-d'Or department

References

Communes of Côte-d'Or